Jacob Christiansen (born September 12, 1999) is a Canadian professional ice hockey defenceman currently playing for the Cleveland Monsters of the American Hockey League (AHL) as a prospect for the Columbus Blue Jackets of the National Hockey League (NHL).

Playing career
Christiansen played major junior hockey in the Western Hockey League (WHL) with the Everett Silvertips. He was originally selected in the fifth-round, 105th overall by the Silvertips in the 2014 WHL Bantam Draft.

Following five junior seasons with the Silvertips, Christiansen embarked on his professional career by signing a professional tryout contract with the Stockton Heat of the American Hockey League, the primary affiliate to the Calgary Flames, to begin the 2019–20 season on October 4, 2019. He made his professional debut against the Bakersfield Condors on October 19, 2019, featuring on the Heat's third-pairing. He featured in 9 games going scoreless before he was released from his tryout and returned to the Everett Silvertips.

In his final overage major junior season, Christiansen notched career bests in registering 22 goals and 28 assists for 50 points in 38 games with the Everett Silvertips, leading the league amongst defensemen in goals and points-per-game. He was signed as an undrafted free agent to a three-year, entry-level contract with the Columbus Blue Jackets on March 4, 2020.

In his first full professional season, Christiansen was reassigned by the Blue Jackets to join AHL affiliate, the Cleveland Monsters, for the shortened pandemic delayed 2020–21 season. He contributed with 3 goals and 15 points through 28 regular season games.

In the following  season, Christiansen continued his tenure with the Monsters before receiving his first recall to Blue Jackets on January 5, 2022. He made his NHL debut with Columbus the following day, playing 12 minutes in a 3–1 defeat to the New Jersey Devils.

Career statistics

Awards and honours

References

External links
 

1999 births
Living people
Cleveland Monsters players
Columbus Blue Jackets players
Everett Silvertips players
Stockton Heat players
Undrafted National Hockey League players
Canadian ice hockey defencemen